The Battle of Malakal occurred at the end of November 2006 in the southern Sudanese town of Malakal. The clashes between Sudanese government forces and the Sudan People's Liberation Army were the most serious breach of a 2005 deal to end the Second Sudanese Civil War.

Battle
According to the SPLA, militia leader Gabriel Tang initiated the clashes by attacking the SPLA and then taking refuge in the local Sudanese Army base. After a demand to hand over Tang was not met, the SPLA attacked the base, causing the Sudanese army to counterattack with tanks. The Sudanese army likewise blamed the SPLA for starting the battle. After three days of fighting the battle eventually subsided, and both sides agreed to disengage to their pre-battle positions.

Aftermath 
Tang's militia would clash with the SPLA again in Malakal in 2009 and in Jonglei in 2011, before eventually surrendering to the SPLA shortly thereafter. The 2006 clash didn't escalate to a dangerous level, and the 2011 South Sudanese independence referendum was held as planned and according to the Comprehensive Peace Agreement of 2005, resulting in South Sudan's independence.

References

External links 
 Sudan: Calm After Heavy Fighting in Southern Town

Health in Sudan
Malakal
2006 in Sudan
Malakal
Malakal
Malakal
November 2006 events in Africa